This is a list of the Australian moth species of the family Limacodidae. It also acts as an index to the species articles and forms part of the full List of moths of Australia.

Anaxidia lactea Swinhoe, 1892
Anaxidia lozogramma (Turner, 1902)
Anepopsia eugyra Turner, 1926
Anepopsia tephraea Turner, 1926
Apodecta monodisca Turner, 1902
Birthamoides plagioscia Turner, 1902
Calcarifera ordinata (Butler, 1886)
Chalcocelis albiguttatus (Snellen, 1879)
Chalcocelis castanica Turner, 1926
Comana albibasis Walker, 1862
Comana collaris Walker, 1865
Comana corones (Fabricius, 1775)
Comana cosmocalla Lower, 1902
Comana euryparoa Turner, 1927
Comana idiomorpa 
Comana inexpectata Hering, 1931
Comana miltochyta (Turner, 1932)
Comana miltogramma Meyrick, 1891
Comana mjobergi (Aurivillius, 1920)
Comana monomorpha Turner, 1904
Comana resplendens (Turner, 1926)
Comanula uniformis Swinhoe, 1892
Doratifera casta (Scott, 1864)
Doratifera corallina Turner, 1902
Doratifera ochroptila Turner, 1926
Doratifera oxleyi (Newman, 1855)
Doratifera pinguis Walker, 1855
Doratifera quadriguttata (Walker, 1855)
Doratifera stenora Turner, 1902
Doratifera vulnerans (Lewin, 1805)
Ecnomoctena brachyopa Lower, 1897
Ecnomoctena hemitoma Turner, 1926
Ecnomoctena sciobaphes Turner, 1941
Elassoptila microxutha Turner, 1902
Eloasa acrata (Turner, 1926)
Eloasa atmodes (Turner, 1902)
Eloasa bombycoides (Felder, 1874)
Eloasa brevipennis (Hering, 1931)
Eloasa calida Walker
Eloasa callidesma (Lower, 1869)
Eloasa infrequens (Scott, 1864)
Eloasa liosarca (Lower, 1902)
Eloasa luxa Swinhoe, 1902
Eloasa perixera (Lower, 1902)
Eloasa sphemosema 
Eloasa symphonistis (Turner, 1936)
Hedraea quadridens Lucas, 1901
Hydroclada antigona Meyrick, 1889
Lamprolepida chrysochroa Felder, 1874
Limacochara pulchra Bethune-Baker, 1904
Mambara haplopis Turner, 1906
Mambara delocrossa Hering, 1931
Mecytha dnophera (Turner 1931)
Mecytha fasciata (Walker, 1855)
Parasoidea albicollaris Hering, 1931
Parasoidea neurocausta (Turner, 1926)
Parasoidea paroa (Turner, 1902)
Praesusica placerodes (Turner, 1926)
Pseudanapaea denotata (Walker, 1865)
Pseudanapaea dentifascia Hering, 1931
Pseudanapaea transvestita Hering, 1931
Pygmaeomorpha aquila (H. Druce, 1899)
Pygmaeomorpha modesta Bethune-Baker, 1904
Pygmaeomorpha ocularis (T.P. Lucas, 1895)
Scopelodes dinawa Bethune-Baker, 1904
Scopelodes nitens Bethune-Baker, 1904
Squamosa barymorpha (Turner, 1942)
Thosea penthima Turner, 1902
Thosea threnopis Turner, 1931

External links 
Limacodidae at Australian insects

Australia